Hiram Leong Fong (born Yau Leong Fong; October 15, 1906 – August 18, 2004) was an American businessman, lawyer, and politician from Hawaii. Born to a Cantonese immigrant sugar plantation worker, Fong became the first Chinese-American and first Asian-American United States Senator, serving from 1959 to 1977.

At the 1964 Republican National Convention, Fong became the first Asian-American to receive delegate votes for his party's nomination for President of the United States. In the Senate, Fong supported civil rights legislation and eliminating ethnic barriers to immigration. As of 2022, Fong is the only Republican to have ever served as a senator from Hawaii.

Early life and education 
Fong was born in the Honolulu neighborhood of Kalihi on the island of Oahu as the seventh of 11 children. His father, Fong Sau Howe, was of Cantonese origin (from modern day Zhuhai) and immigrated to Hawaii in 1872, along with nearly 45,000 other immigrants who would work on sugar plantations. Fong began working at age four picking beans for cattle feed, and by the age of seven was working as a shoeshiner.

Fong attended local public schools and graduated from McKinley High School in 1924. Masaji Marumoto, who went on to become the first Japanese-American Justice on the Supreme Court of Hawaii, was a classmate. In 1930, Fong obtained a degree from the University of Hawaii at Manoa, and in 1935 obtained a law degree from Harvard Law School.

Early career

Legal and military career 
After returning to Hawaii, Fong worked in the Office of the Prosecuting Attorney of Honolulu. In 1938, Fong went into private legal practice and founded the firm of Fong, Miho, Choy, and Robinson. In 1942, he changed his name to "Hiram", reportedly in honor of Hiram Bingham I, an early Protestant missionary in Hawaii.

During World War II he served as a major in the United States Army Air Forces as a Judge Advocate, later retiring as a colonel from the United States Air Force Reserve.

Territorial politics 
The same year he founded his law office, Fong entered elected political life as a member of the Hawaii Territorial House of Representatives where he became Speaker of the House from 1948 to 1954. During this time, he was one of the foremost leaders in the fight to make Hawaii a state. As a territorial legislator, Fong was a delegate to the 1952 Republican National Convention.

Fong was forced into retirement when the Democratic Party of Hawaii successfully ended a Hawaii Republican Party stronghold over the Hawaii Territorial Legislature by voting most Republican incumbents out of office. Fong founded several businesses after leaving the legislature.

Early business ventures 
In 1952, along with five other island families, Hiram Fong started Finance Factors, one of the first industrial and consumer loan companies, to service the growing numbers of minorities who were seeking to start new businesses and buy homes.

United States Senate 

After Hawaii achieved statehood in 1959, Fong became one of the state's first two U.S. Senators, serving alongside popular former Governor Oren E. Long, a Democrat.

According to The Washington Post, Fong's political success can be partially attributed to the support he received from the powerful International Longshore and Warehouse Union. In office, Fong was generally regarded as a moderate Republican, voting in favor of many of President Lyndon B. Johnson's "Great Society" initiatives, such as the establishment of Medicare in 1965.

In the 1959 election, Fong won against Democrat Frank Fasi by a margin of 52.9 to 47.1%. In 1964, Fong was reelected with 53% of the vote against Democrat Thomas Gill, who received 46.4%. Fong was reelected again in 1970 by an even closer margin of 51.6 to 48.4% versus Democrat Cecil Heftel. In 1976, Fong chose to retire rather than seek reelection, and was succeeded by Democrat Spark Matsunaga.

Party politics 
Fong was twice honored as Hawaii's favorite son at the Republican National Convention in 1964 and 1968. In 1964, he became the first Asian American to receive votes for president at a major party convention, receiving the votes of the Hawaii and Alaska delegations.

Fong was booed by an audience for defending George Romney, then-Secretary of Housing and Development, in the wake of a real estate industry scandal.

In 1960, Richard Nixon remarked that "the American dream is not just a dream, it does come true – Hiram Fong's life proves it" during a visit to Hawaii.

Civil rights and immigration 
Fong voted in favor of the Civil Rights Acts of 1960, 1964, and 1968, as well as the 24th Amendment to the U.S. Constitution Fong supported the Voting Rights Act of 1965, and wrote an amendment to have poll watchers safeguard the election process. Additionally, Fong voted in favor the confirmation of Thurgood Marshall to the U.S. Supreme Court.

In 1965, during debate on Immigration and Nationality Act of 1965 Fong answered questions concerning the possible change in U.S. cultural patterns by an influx of Asians: 
"Asians represent six-tenths of 1 percent of the population of the United States ... concerning Japan, we estimate that there will be a total for the first 5 years of some 5,391 ... the people from that part of the world will never reach 1 percent of the population ...Our cultural pattern will never be changed as far as America is concerned." (U.S. Senate, Subcommittee on Immigration and Naturalization of the Committee on the Judiciary, Washington, D.C., Feb. 10, 1965, pp.71, 119.)

Foreign policy 
During Nixon's presidency, Fong was a vocal supporter of the Vietnam War, which reportedly left many Asian-American constituents displeased. According to the Honolulu Star-Bulletin, Fong's support for the Vietnam War led to him losing votes in the 1970 election, his last reelection campaign.

Personal life and legacy 
Fong married Ellyn Lo in 1938; they had four children. After retiring from the Senate, Fong faced financial and legal difficulties, including several lawsuits with a son over the family's businesses that forced him and his wife to declare bankruptcy in 2003. They managed a botanical garden of  that was opened to the public in 1988.

On August 18, 2004, Hiram Fong died of kidney failure at his home in Honolulu.

Fong was a Congregationalist and was buried in Nuuanu Memorial Park and Mortuary.

Papers 
Fong's papers were donated to the University of Hawaii at Manoa Library in August 1998. Fong also provided financial support to the preservation and inventorying of over a thousand boxes, crates, and trunks of documents. Within them included papers, photos, videos, and memorabilia from Fong's congressional tenure and pre-political life, including law school notes. Included in the collection are series of Washington. D.C. and Hawaii office files, Post Office and Civil Service Committee (POCS) materials, and political souvenirs.

Approximately 80 boxes of books accompanied Fong's papers, several dedicated his work on Senate committees such as the POCS. A few of the books were kept with the congressional collection, though the majority were added to the university library. A gift book plate was designed for these incorporating the senator's noted signature. The papers were processed in 2003 by archivist Dee Hazelrigg, and are available to researchers by appointment.

See also 
 List of Asian Americans and Pacific Islands Americans in the United States Congress

References

External links 

FONG, Hiram Leong | US House of Representatives: History, Art & Archives

|-

|-

1906 births
2004 deaths
20th-century American businesspeople
20th-century American politicians
American Congregationalists
American financial company founders
American military personnel of Chinese descent
United States Army Air Forces personnel of World War II
American prosecutors
Businesspeople from Hawaii
Candidates in the 1964 United States presidential election
Candidates in the 1968 United States presidential election
Harvard Law School alumni
Hawaii lawyers
Hawaii people of Chinese descent
Republican Party members of the Hawaii House of Representatives
Hawaii politicians of Chinese descent
United States Army Judge Advocate General's Corps
Members of the Hawaii Territorial Legislature
Members of the United States Congress of Chinese descent
Politicians from Honolulu
Republican Party United States senators from Hawaii
Asian-American United States senators
Speakers of the Hawaii House of Representatives
United States Army Air Forces officers
University of Hawaiʻi at Mānoa alumni
Asian conservatism in the United States